The Haitian worm snake (Typhlops tetrathyreus) is a species of snake in the Typhlopidae family.

References

Typhlops
Reptiles described in 1989